Jon S. Eubanks is an American politician, farmer, and accountant serving as a member of the Arkansas House of Representatives from the 74th district. First elected in 2010, he also serves as speaker pro tempore of the House.

Early life and education 
Eubanks was born in Portsmouth, Virginia and graduated from Annapolis High School in 1969. He attended Virginia Tech and earned a Bachelor of Science degree in accounting from Arkansas Tech University in 1990.

Career 
Outside of politics, Eubanks has worked as a farmer and Certified Public Accountant. He previously served on the board of the Paris School District.

References 

21st-century American politicians
Arkansas Tech University alumni
Living people
Republican Party members of the Arkansas House of Representatives
People from Portsmouth, Virginia
Year of birth missing (living people)